Harriet Mills may refer to:

 Harriet Cornelia Mills (1920–2016), China scholar
 Harriet May Mills (1857–1935), civil rights leader